Shallow frying is a hot oil-based cooking technique. It is typically used to prepare portion-sized cuts of meat, fish, potatoes and patties such as fritters. Shallow frying can also be used to cook vegetables.

Technique 
It is a medium-high to high heat cooking process. The high heat promotes protein denaturation-browning and, in some cases, a Maillard reaction. Deep-frying usually takes place at temperatures between  so shallow-frying can oftentimes be considered a less intense cooking technique. Foods to be shallow fried are commonly pre-portioned into single servings before being placed in oil. Since the food is only partly submerged, it must be turned over partway through the cooking process. Some cooks recommend cooking the "presentation" side of the food first.

Dishes 
Both deep-fried and shallow-fried foods are often battered, breaded or floured (usually with wheat flour or corn starch) prior to being cooked; this step is sometimes referred to as breading, crumbing, velveting or dredging depending on the ingredients being used. The structure of these starchy coatings become rigid and porous when heated in oil; this is due to their high amylose content. Rigid coatings increase the palatability of fried food by inhibiting moisture loss and creating the desirable ‘crispiness’ trait. Resultantly, foods fried with starch are sometimes called “crisp-fried.”

Health 
The healthfulness of shallow frying has been scrutinized in literature. The results of a study on fish fry found that shallow frying fish provoked higher thermo-oxidation than cooking in a microwave. Studies have shown that margarine, virgin olive oil and similar cooking oils oxidize and destabilize substantially when they are shallow-fried, especially when compared to oils used during baking. In turn, a large amount of heat-sensitive nutrients may degrade, and antioxidant properties are lost. In this regard, shallow frying food may be a healthier alternative to long-term deep-frying processes. The fat soluble vitamins and fatty acids in cooking oils show comparatively reasonable stability when they are used for shallow frying rather than deep frying. 

Despite being a less intense frying method, the adverse effects of shallow frying are equitable to the ones associated with deep frying in some regards. The oil absorption rates of shallow fried foods are similar to that of foods that have been deep-fried at proper temperatures; consequently, shallow-frying is not a better alternative for calorie control or weight management. Some research shows shallow frying and deep frying highly increased the acrylamide content in foods like potatoes and grains to a similar degree. Roasting the same potatoes kept acrylamide production comparatively low in spite of being cooked at a higher temperature setting. It is controversial whether dietary acrylamide poses a substantial danger, but since the Joint Food and Agriculture Organization/World Health Organization Expert Committee on Food Additives concluded that acrylamide is a human health concern there have been efforts to discover methods of decreasing its formation. It has been observed that blanching, pre-soaking food in either distilled water or acidulated water and lowering frying temperature can all partially attenuate acrylamide formation. 

Fried foods have been linked with an increased relative risk of chronic disease. Prehypertension & hypertension has been associated with frequently consuming any kind of food that has been shallow fried or deep fried. In 2021 the journal Heart published a meta-analysis of observational studies; results indicated fried-food increases the relative risk of developing cardiovascular diseases in a linear dose–response relation. Compared to participants with low-intake, those who ate the most fried food had a 37% increased risk of heart failure, 28% increased risk of major cardiovascular events and a 22% increased risk of coronary heart disease. Risk of stroke, heart failure and heart attack modestly increased for each weekly serving of fried food. Researchers theorized the main reasons behind these associations are due to fried food having trans fats, many calories, and a pro-inflammatory nature. It was also noted that eating hyperpalatable crisp-fried foods may be enticing individuals to engage in routine overeating.

See also
 Pan frying
 Sautéing
 Sweating

References

Cooking techniques
Culinary terminology
Fried foods